Year 178 (CLXXVIII) was a common year starting on Wednesday (link will display the full calendar) of the Julian calendar. At the time, it was known as the Year of the Consulship of Scipio and Rufus (or, less frequently, year 931 Ab urbe condita). The denomination 178 for this year has been used since the early medieval period, when the Anno Domini calendar era became the prevalent method in Europe for naming years.

Events 
 By place 

 Roman Empire 
 Bruttia Crispina marries Commodus, and receives the title of Augusta.
 Emperor Marcus Aurelius and his son Commodus arrive at Carnuntum in Pannonia, and travel to the Danube to fight against the Marcomanni.

 Asia 
 Last (7th) year of Xiping era and start of Guanghe era of the Chinese Han Dynasty.
 In India, the decline of the Kushan Empire begins.  The Sassanides take over Central Asia.

 Religion 
 The Montanist heresy is condemned for the first time.

Births 
 Lü Meng, Chinese general (d. 220)
 Peng Yang, Chinese official (d. 214)
 Zhang Cheng, Chinese general (d. 244)

Deaths 
 February 12 – Agrippinus, patriarch of Alexandria
 Song, Chinese empress of the Han Dynasty

References